Denis Vidal (born 4 July 1954) is a French anthropologist with a doctorate degree from the Ecole Pratique des Hautes Etudes and the Université de Nanterre. He is an associate professor at the EHESS School for Advanced Studies in the Social Sciences and a senior research fellow (Directeur de recherche) at the Institut de recherche pour le développement.

Education and career

Research
Vidal is a social anthropologist. He is serving as a research director at the Institut de recherche pour le développement, and as the assistant director at the Paris branch of the Migrations and Society Research Unit (URMIS).

Vidal has been exploring India since his doctoral studies. Some of his research works on India include the "archival exploration" of Sirohi State and his studies on the "economic organisation of the bazaar", the social and religious anthropology of the Himalayas, and "visual culture of the old city of Delhi". He delved into the disputed contest over the patent rights of Basmati rice between India and the United States. Vidal has also explored "new ways of approaching technology from an anthropological perspective". In 2019, Vidal, along with D. Balasubramanian, carried out a study on the building of wooden cargo ships in India's Tamil Nadu.

Berenson (Robot)
Vidal and Philippe Gaussier co-developed a "robot art critic" dubbed Berenson (after the art critic Bernard Berenson). Berenson can take note of the reactions of people to art works and employ its neural network to learn from their reactions in order to develop its own aesthetic preferences and to express them through facial expressions.

Museum exhibitions

Vidal has been one of the curators of the exhibition Persona (Musée du Quai Branly, Paris, January - October 2016, ,and of the permanent exhibition on robotics  at the Cité des Sciences et de l'Industrie, Paris (opening in April 2019)

Written work
Vidal's Violence and Truth: A Rajasthani Kingdom Confronts Colonial Authority (1995) was a study of history of the Sirohi State, focusing mainly on the influence exerted by British values and legal system on politics and society in Sirohi during the late 19th and early 20th centuries, providing "a vivid picture of caste-specific protest repertory". Vidal's study shed light on the relationship between the rulers of Sirohi and the Jain merchants with regard to the "colonial idea of economy"; inquired into the relationship between violence and mutineers in Rajasthan and how it was "remade through the colonial encounter"; and explored the Gandhian thought in apropos of the British colonial laws in India.

for various reviews of this book, see Norbert Peabody  
,Christophe Jaffrelot, Frank de Zwart, Ajay Skaria Skaria(August 1999). And for an indepth study of it see Lawrence Babb, 2004

Works

Books authored

Laumond J.P., Vidal Denis, Boutin A.L. (ill.). (2018). Robots : le livre de l'exposition Robots : the exhibition book. [Paris] : Cité des Sciences et de l'Industrie,  ISBN 978-2-86842-197-5.

 Vidal Denis,Le culte des divinités locales dans une région de l'Himachal  Pradesh  Paris , ORSTOM, 1989,  320p.

Books edited

Emmanuel Grimaud, Yann Philippe Tastevin, Denis Vidal. dossier : Low tech ? Wild tech !. France. Techniques et culture, 1 (67), Éditions de l'EHESS, 288 p., 2017. 

Denis Vidal. Dufrêne T. (ed.), Grimaud E. (ed.), Taylor A.C. (ed.), Vidal Denis (ed.). Persona : étrangement humain [exposition, Musée du quai Branly, Paris, 26 janvier-13 novembre 2016]Paris : Musée du Quai Branly ; Actes Sud, 2016, 271 p. ISBN 978-2-330-03801-4 . France. Musée du Quai Branly ; Actes Sud, 271 p., 2016. 
Grimaud E., Houdard S., Vidal Denis. (2006). Artifices et effets spéciaux : les troubles de la représentation. In : Grimaud E. (ed.), Houdard S. (ed.), Vidal Denis (ed.). Effets spéciaux et artifices. Terrain, 46, p. 5-14. ISSN 0760-5668.
Dupont Véronique (ed.), Tarlo E. (ed.), Vidal Denis (ed.). (2000). Delhi : urban space and human destinies. New Delhi : Manohar, 261 p. ISBN 81-7304-366-3. 
Denis Vidal, Philippe Cadene. Webs of trade : dynamics of business communities in western India. India. CHS ; Manohar, 196 p., 1997.Webs of Trade,

Selected papers
 Vidal D, Balasubramanian D.« Les cargos en bois de l’Inde du Sud ». Face à la puissance: Une histoire des énergies alternatives à l’âge  industriel,   Paris, La Découverte , 2020.
 Vidal D , Balasubramaniam D « Comment s’inventent les bateaux ? Cargos en bois du Tamil Nadu » Low Tech ?Wild Tech ! Techniques et Culture , 2017

Notes

References

External links

1954 births
French anthropologists
Social anthropologists
21st-century anthropologists
21st-century French educators
Anthropology writers
Living people